Cycling Without Age (CWA) is a nonprofit organization founded in Copenhagen, Denmark in 2012. By 2020, this initiative had expanded into 50 countries, serving over 1.5 million people worldwide.

The purpose of Cycling Without Age is: "to realise the dream of creating a world in which the easy access to active citizenship creates happiness among our elderly citizens and gives them an opportunity to remain an active part of the local community."

Under the motto "The right to wind in your hair", Cycling Without Age offers recreational mobility to seniors, in the form of volunteer-piloted trishaw rides.  This type of common activity promotes communication between the senior passengers and their riders (called pilots), thus facilitating the goal of the initiative: "we build bridges between generations, we reinforce trust, respect and the social glue in our society".

Cycling Without Age has chapters throughout the world. Each chapter is typically at the service of a specific nursing home. The trishaw rides are offered by local volunteer pilots. These rides enable seniors with limited mobility to explore their neighbourhood and the surrounding nature.

History
The history of Cycling Without Age began in Copenhagen in 2012 when the 47-year-old social entrepreneur Ole Kassow cycled to work every day. On his way he noticed an elderly gentleman sitting in front of a senior citizens' home. This encounter stuck in his memory. Later, when looking at historical pictures of his hometown, he wondered whether this gentleman used to enjoy cycling in his younger years as much as Ole himself did nowadays. After thinking about it for a while, an idea formed in his mind: Ole rented a trishaw, rode it to the senior citizens' home and offered a ride. An elderly lady and her caregiver were his passengers on the first trishaw trip.

The route took them to sites the elderly lady knew from years gone by. She told him stories from that time and was very happy to see these places again. The trip was a great success and soon other residents of the home wanted a ride with the trishaw. With the support of the residence's management, a spontaneous idea became a regular leisure-time facility.

When Ole Kassow wrote to the city council of Copenhagen and asked for the financing of the trishaw for the senior citizens' home, he surprisingly found support there too: five trishaws were ordered in one fell swoop. With a parade of the new trishaws in April 2013, the initiative was presented to the public - two television stations and various newspapers reported.

Ole Kassow's idea gave rise to the initiative  which spread quickly in Denmark and soon afterwards in many countries around the world. As of March 2020, there were 2200 regional chapters with over 3000 trishaws in more than 50 countries in Europe, North America, Asia and Australasia (including New Zealand).

Often a Cycling Without Age chapter is formed in a neighbourhood area. That group then organizes a trishaw and makes it available for excursions to surrounding senior citizens' facilities and other social institutions. Volunteers are instructed in the handling of the trishaw and make themselves available as pilots in their free time. Other Cycling Without Age chapters are associated with a specific social institution and serve only that facility.

Impact
The majority "loved the trips, felt more motivated and would recommend CWA. The main reasons they liked CWA" was "going out for a ride and get distracted."

In 2019, a study by the German  (Institute for Education, Upbringing and Guidance) found that the trips offered by Cycling Without Age generally have a positive effect on older people. The passengers benefit from the many new social contacts and perceive the outings as an enrichment for their everyday life. With the extended range of travel, they can experience the great outdoors again and visit places they have fond memories of. In particular, however, the passengers enjoy the conversations with the trishaw pilot and other people they meet. 

Due to the special design of the trishaws used by Cycling Without Age (passengers in front, rider at the back), communication is possible at any time without any problems: 'The social isolation, which is a major hurdle in everyday life for many seniors, is inevitably reduced or even dissolved by Cycling Without Age — from which not only the seniors, but also the pilots themselves benefit enormously. The positive experiences with the pilots are also very far-reaching. They lose fear of contact with the older generation and learn to interact with them in a casual and relaxed manner. The drivers can combine sporting activity with social commitment and also have important interpersonal experiences.'

A 2019 impact study from Singapore found that nursing home residents experienced an increase in self-reported mood and outlook on life of 80% after 5 rides. Among young volunteers the report found a 36% increase in comfort level communicating and interacting with seniors.

A 2020 study in Scotland also looked at the effects of the Cycling Without Age initiative on the mood and well-being of residents in senior citizens' facilities: "Analyses revealed significant improvements in mood and wellbeing at follow-up on ride days versus no ride days."

Reports in the media confirm the positive impacts of trishaw outings with seniors and their drivers: "It creates extraordinary experiences for them. They come out of that building and they get that wind in their hair and they are smiling from ear to ear." "Many of the passengers talk about the joy of having the wind in their hair again. Some passengers have told me after a ride 'I am so happy' which makes me tear up!"

Principles
All trips with the senior citizens are always free. This is based on the five guiding principles of Cycling Without Age: 

 Generosity — donate time and kindness
 Slowness — take time to sense the environment, be present in the moment and to meet and talk
 Storytelling — listen and share the stories we hear from older adults before they are forgotten
 Relationships — build trust, happiness and quality of life by creating relationships between generations, passengers and pilots, caregivers and family members
 Without Age — let people age in a positive context aware of opportunities that lie ahead

The trips with senior citizens' facilities are carried out by volunteers in their free time. The communication between the passengers and their pilots is very important, so a special type of trishaw is used where the passengers sit in front and can clearly hear what the pilot says, and where the pilots can easily understand their passengers' stories. This facilitates the development of a relationship between passengers and pilots. By riding slowly and leisurely, they together experience and enjoy the landscape and cityscape along the chosen route intensively.

Cycling Without Age thus supports the following Sustainable Development Goals, set in 2015 by the United Nations General Assembly:
 3.4 — Promote mental health and well-being
 10.2 — Empower and promote the social inclusion of all irrespective of age
 11.2 — Provide access to safe, affordable, accessible and sustainable transport systems for all
 11.6 — Increase the number of cities and human settlement adopting and implementing integrated policies and plans towards inclusion

Organization
The umbrella organization of Cycling Without Age is a non-political, not-for-profit association with its place of business in Copenhagen, Denmark. It coordinates all world-wide activities, provides a Brand Book and a visual identity package, hosts web and IT infrastructure, consults with trishaw manufacturers, supports research and development, offers presentations and workshops, and publishes documentation about the initiative.

Some countries — especially those with many local chapters — have formed a national umbrella organization. These umbrella organizations provide regional support to new and existing chapters by counseling, organizing events, providing country-specific social media channels and access to a research and knowledge bank, as well as training to staff, pilots and instructors.

Sometimes, long excursions are organized by the regional organizations, for example, in 2014 from Odense (Denmark) to Hamburg (Germany), in 2015 from Rønde (Denmark) to Arendal (Norway), in 2019 along the Rhine river from Lake Constance to Bonn (Germany). 

Local chapters may be organized at a specific senior citizens' facility, as a community initiative, or by a local parish. Captains at each site are experienced pilots: they are responsible for the trishaw, organize the trips, recruit and train new pilots. There are different ways in which chapters are organized, arrange the communication between pilots and their passengers, and finance the trishaw and its maintenance. Local chapters may have regular meetings, provide first-aid classes, and engage in public relations events.

References

External links
 Official Cycling Without Age website (with direct links to all country-specific websites)
 Flickr Photo Database
 YouTube Channel
 YouTube Playlist includes TEDxCopenhagen 2014 Presentation by Ole Kassow
 Vimeo Documentary on CWA

Social enterprises
Elderly care
Organizations established in 2012
International development agencies
2012 establishments in Denmark